Revenge of Others is a South Korean streaming television series starring Shin Ye-eun and Lomon. It premiered on Disney+ on November 9, 2022.

Synopsis 
Shooting champion Ok Chan-mi does not believe that her twin brother committed suicide. Just as the police begin to wrap up the case, Chan-mi transfers to her brother's school to find his killer. She meets and gets involved with Ji Soo-heon, a boy with many adversities in his life who also seeks justice, but in a rather dangerous way. Together, they work towards a common goal; getting revenge on perpetrators, despite knowing the risk.

Cast

Main 
 Shin Ye-eun as Ok Chan-mi, the twin sister of Ok Chan-kyu who transferred to Yong-Tan High School to find his murderer as she does not believe that he committed suicide.
 Lomon as Ji Soo-heon, a student in Class 3 of Yong-Tan High School, who is suffering and in urgent need of money. He helps bullied students take revenge on their bullies by beating up the bullies and thus gets paid for it.

Supporting

Yongtan High School Students 
 Seo Ji-hoon as Seok Jae-beom, a student of Class 4 in Yong-Tan High School, who is the son of a wealthy family. He recently woke up from a six-month coma, making him resit the year as a senior, and has lost all of his memories.
 Chae Sang-woo as Gi Oh-sung, a class president of Class 4 in Yong-Tan High School, who was Jae-beom's friend before Jae-Beom lost all his memories and tries to help Jae-beom get his memories back.
 Lee Soo-min as Kuk Ji-hyun
 Jung Soo-bin as Tae So-yeon
 Yeon-oh as Im Seung-woo
 Wooyeon as Hong Ah-jeong, Park Won-seok's girlfriend.
 Kang Yeol as Ok Chan-kyu / Park Won-Seok, Ok Chan-mi's twin brother who died.
 Jin Ho-eun as Sa Jung-Kyung, a bully who sexually assaulted Seon-ha when they were previously in the same photography club.
 Hwang Bo-woon as Seo Da-yeon
 Ahn Hyun-ho as Min Seon-ha, a victim of bullying and was previously in the same photography club as Jung-Kyung, where he sexually assaulted her.
 Moon Ye-jin as Park Na-rin, a friend of Kuk Ji-Hyeon. She is susceptible to all the happenings at school and has the heart to hate her friend Ji-Hyeon.

Police 
 Kim Joo-ryoung as Jin So-jeong, a detective who was the case manager of Park Won-seok's death. 
 Jang Hyun-sung as Gi Wang-do, Chief of Yongtan Police Station and Gi Oh-sung's father.
 Shin Su-ho as Hyun Jong-kook

Other 

 Seo Hye-rin as Yang Hye-jeong, Kuk Ji-hyeon's mother.
 Kang Yi-seok as Kwon Se-jin
 Yoon Jin-sung as Shin Yu-kyung, Ji Soo-heon's mother.

Production 
On September 7, 2022, the cast was announced to include Shin Ye-eun and Lomon who had already been confirmed as the lead roles.

References

External links 
 
 

Korean-language television shows
Disney+ original programming
Television series about revenge
Television series by Studio S
2022 South Korean television series debuts
2022 South Korean television series endings
Star (Disney+) original programming